The 2016 Esiliiga B was the 4th season of the Esiliiga B, third-highest Estonian league for association football clubs, since its establishment in 2013. The season began on 28 February 2016 and concluded on 6 November 2016.

Kuressaare won the league, finishing with 76 points and were promoted to the Esiliiga. It was their first Esiliiga B title in history.

Teams

Stadia

Personnel and kits

Managerial changes

Results

League table

Results tables

First half of the season

Second half of the season

Play-offs

Promotion play-offs
Welco, who finished 3rd, faced Nõmme Kalju U21, 8th-placed 2016 Esiliiga side for a two-legged play-off. The first leg originally ended 3–2 to Nõmme Kalju U21 but they were later ruled to have forfeited the match after fielding an ineligible player Henrik Pürg. According to the rules, the second leg was cancelled and Welco earned entry into the 2017 Esiliiga.

First leg

Second leg

Relegation play-offs
Viimsi, who finished 8th, faced Keila, the II liiga play-offs winner. The winner on aggregate score after both matches earned entry into the 2017 Esiliiga B. Viimsi won on away goals.

First leg

Second leg

Season statistics

Top goalscorers

Awards

Monthly awards

Esiliiga B Player of the Year
Jürgen Kuresoo was named Esiliiga B Player of the Year.

See also
 2015–16 Estonian Cup
 2016–17 Estonian Cup
 2016 Meistriliiga
 2016 Esiliiga

References

External links
Official website

Esiliiga B seasons
3
Estonia
Estonia